The Brabham BT52 was a Formula One car designed for the Brabham team by longtime Brabham designer Gordon Murray for the  season. Its drivers were  World Champion Nelson Piquet and Riccardo Patrese.

History
After the ground effect cars were banned at the end of the previous season, the FIA mandated that all F1 cars be designed with flat undersides for safety reasons. With just 6 weeks until the opening race in Brazil, this left Brabham with three fully built BT51's ready to go that were now useless, so Murray started from scratch and he designed the BT52. The previously crucial sidepods were now generating lift rather than suction and so the BT52 had short, angular sidepods to keep lift at a minimum. Murray also took a gamble and moved approximately 70% of the cars weight to the rear in an effort to obtain more traction. The car featured a distinctive dart-shaped profile and oversized rear wing in an effort to claw back as much downforce as possible, while the monocoque was built from aluminium and carbon fibre composite to keep weight as low as possible. The 1983 season saw refueling stops reintroduced after successful experiments in  so the BT52's fuel system was designed with this in mind and had a small fuel tank positioned high up behind the driver.

The car was easy to drive and Piquet used it to good effect that season. Fighting with Alain Prost in the Renault and René Arnoux of Ferrari, it seemed he would lose out on the title after a run of mid season bad luck. But after German company Wintershall developed a special batch of fuel and further development to the car was done, he became the first driver to win the world championship with a turbo engine after winning three races, Brazil (Rd.1), Italy (Rd.13) and European (Rd.14), and scoring consistently with three 2nd and two 3rd places. Patrese on the other hand seemed to corner the market on Brabham's bad luck and while often as quick or quicker than Piquet (including leading the San Marino Grand Prix before crashing out with only 6 laps remaining, and grabbing pole at Monza) he didn't score a point until his third in Round 10 at the German Grand Prix. His only other points finish being his win at the season ending South African Grand Prix at Kyalami.

With Piquet winning his second World Drivers' Championship with 59 points, and Patrese finishing 9th on 13 points, Brabham finished third in the Constructors' Championship with 72 points, 7 behind second placed Renault and 17 behind winners Ferrari.

The BT52 was updated after the Canadian Grand Prix to the BT52B and proceeded to win three of the remaining seven races of the season. The two variants of the chassis can easily be distinguished as the colour scheme was also reversed at the same time. A further update came later in the season when Brabham adopted the Ferrari style 'winglets' on the rear wing in order to generate more downforce. The BT52 was replaced for the  Formula One season by the Brabham BT53.

Gallery

Complete Formula One World Championship results
(key) (Races in bold indicate pole position; races in italics indicate fastest lap)

References

External links

Brabham Formula One cars
1983 Formula One season cars
Formula One championship-winning cars